The Clie NX, were a series of handheld PDAs made by Sony, their first running the Palm OS 5.0 operating system. They had a clam-shell form factor, with a vertical rotatable screen. Most of these models also had a rotatable camera built in.

Models 
The NX series succeeds the NR series.

PEG-NX60 & PEG-NX70V 

The NX60 and NX70V were the first models in this series to be released, announced in  October 2002. Notably, they were the 9th and 10th PDA models to be released by Sony that year. Being otherwise identical, the NX70 featured a VGA (0.3MP) digital camera built-in.

These models featured both Memory Stick and CompactFlash card expansion ports, but the CF slot was advertised as a "Wireless Communication Slot" and was only compatible with specific Sony wireless LAN cards, the PEGA-WL100 and PEGA-WL110. Third-party drivers were eventually available for these models that enabled support for CF memory storage as well.

Specifications
Specifications from Mobile Tech Review. 
Palm OS: 5.0
CPU: Intel XScale PXA250 200 MHz
Memory: 16MB RAM, 16MB ROM
Display: 480 × 320, 16bit Colour
Sound: Internal audio amplifier and speaker, Headphone out.
External Connectors: USB
Expansion: Memory Stick Pro, Compact Flash (Type II), Wireless LAN (In form of Compact Flash expansion card sold separately by Sony)
Wireless: Infrared
Battery: Rechargeable Li-Ion
Size & Weight: 5 1/2 (H) × 2 7/8 (W) × 15/16 (D) inches, 8 oz.
Color: Silver

PEG-NX73V & PEG-NX80V 
Announced in May 2003, the Clie PEG-NX73V and PEG-NX80V are similar to the previous models, but with some minor cosmetic changes. The functionality of the Compact Flash port was expanded, and now CF cards were supported for file storage as well.
On the NX80 the storage was upgraded to 32MB, and the camera bumped up to a 1.3MP CCD, while the NX73 remained at 16MB and 0.3MP respectively.

Specifications
Specifications from CNET.
Palm OS: 5.0
CPU: Intel XScale PXA263 ARM CPU at 200 MHz
Memory: 16 MB RAM (NX73)/32MB (NX80), 11 MB/27 MB available to user and 5 MB reserved for system use
Display: 480 × 320, 16bit Color
Sound: Internal audio amplifier and speaker, built-in microphone, Headphone out (with connector for audio player remote control widget).
External Connectors: USB
Expansion: Memory Stick Pro, CompactFlash (Type II), Wireless LAN
Wireless: Infrared (Bluetooth for European models)
Battery: Rechargeable lithium-ion polymer
Size: 2.9 in × 0.9 in × 5.3 in
Weight: 8 oz
Color: Metal Grey
Camera: VGA 0.3MP (NX73)/1.3MP CCD (NX80), 160 × 112 for movies
Keyboard: miniature QWERTY keyboard

Accessories 
Several accessories were produced for the NX series:

Game Controller 
One of the accessories of note for the NX series, was a plug-in game controller, the PEGA-GC10.

Wireless LAN card 
Sony produced two wireless expansion cards for these models, to provide internet access, the PEGA-WL100, and the PEGA-WL110. Both cards supported 802.11b. However, they suffered from a curious Palm OS 5.0 limitation of only being able to transfer files up to 1MB in size.

See also
Sony CLIÉ NZ Series: The NZ series succeeds the NX series.

References

 
Personal digital assistants
Sony CLIÉ